The women's 10 kilometre classical cross-country skiing competition at the 2002 Winter Olympics in Salt Lake City, United States, was held on 12 February at Soldier Hollow.

Each skier started at half a minute intervals, skiing the entire 10 kilometre course. The defending Olympic champion was the Russia Larisa Lazutina, who won in Nagano, but the 10 kilometre event was then held as a pursuit.

The race
Early in the race, Norwegian Bente Skari was well behind Russian Olga Danilova. Danilova led by over 15 seconds at 5.8 km, but Skari had closed to within 10 seconds at 8.7 km. Norway's Skari finished strongly, defeating Danilova to win by 2 seconds. The bronze medal went to russian Yuliya Chepalova, the 2000-01 World Cup champion. Fourth was another Russian, Larisa Lazutina.

In October 2003, Olga Danilova was disqualified for use of darpopoietin, an erythropoietin analogue. In January 2004 Lazutina was disqualified for use of the same substance. Chepalova was moved up to the silver medal, while fifth-place finisher Stefania Belmondo was awarded the bronze medal. Chepalova was also later found guilty of doping, but her results were left unaffected.

Results 
The race was started at 09:00.

References

Women's cross-country skiing at the 2002 Winter Olympics
Women's 10 kilometre cross-country skiing at the Winter Olympics